Givat Haim was a kibbutz located around five kilometres south of Hadera in Israel. It split along ideological lines in 1952, creating two new kibbutzim, Givat Haim (Meuhad) and Givat Haim (Ihud).

History
Founded in 1932 by European immigrants, it was originally called Kibbutz Gimel, but was later renamed in honour of Haim Arlosoroff, who was assassinated in 1933. Like Ein Harod, the kibbutz split in 1952 in the wake of ideological differences between supporters of the two main socialist parties, Mapai and Mapam. This created two new and separate kibbutzim: Givat Haim (Ihud), affiliated with Mapai and belonging to Ihud HaKvutzot veHaKibbutzim and Givat Haim (Meuhad), affiliated with Mapam and belonging to HaKibbutz HaMeuhad

Gallery

Notable residents
Yitzhak Ben-Aharon, Minister of Transport and member of the Knesset for Mapam.

References

Former kibbutzim
Hefer Valley Regional Council
Populated places established in 1932
1952 disestablishments
Geography of Central District (Israel)